Donald L. Patterson (1935/1936 – 6 December, 2016) was the Pennsylvania Inspector General under Governor Ed Rendell from 2003 to 2011. He had previously been a member of the Green Berets and a paratrooper of the 82nd Airborne Division.

Patterson was married to Elaine M. Patterson for 63 years until his death. The couple had four children.

References

State cabinet secretaries of Pennsylvania
1930s births
2016 deaths
Year of birth uncertain